Kokre refers to the following places:

 Kokre, Estonia, village in Estonia
 Kokre, Prilep, village in North Macedonia